Polyscias paniculata is a species of flowering plant in the family Araliaceae. It is endemic to Mauritius.  It is threatened by habitat loss.

References

paniculata
Endemic flora of Mauritius
Critically endangered plants
Taxonomy articles created by Polbot
Taxa named by John Gilbert Baker
Taxa named by Alphonse Pyramus de Candolle